University of Oregon real estate includes buildings in a variety of architectural styles and eras. Many buildings on the main campus were designed by Ellis F. Lawrence, who joined the university in 1914 as campus planner, but by 1915 he had founded the School of Architecture and had become chief architect of the university. Lawrence also held a commission to design all buildings on campus as long as he remained in charge of the School of Architecture. This commission was a source of extra income for Lawrence, and he designed buildings until his death in 1946. Some of the Lawrence buildings are listed on the National Register of Historic Places. Others are not themselves listed but are included in NRHP site surveys. The Memorial Quadrangle, for example, contains buildings listed as contributing resources in the site survey for the Knight Library. These buildings are Condon Hall, Chapman Hall, and the Jordan Schnitzer Museum of Art, although the museum is also separately listed. The Women's Memorial Quadrangle is listed on the NRHP, and it contains three more Lawrence buildings which are contributing resources, Gerlinger Hall, Hendricks Hall, and Susan Campbell Hall.
 
Although the Lawrence era was highly significant in defining the real estate of the University of Oregon, some buildings predated Lawrence. Deady Hall, for example, opened in 1876, and it was known as the "old building" when Villard Hall opened in 1886. Villard was the "new building."

The university continues to design and build, acquire and renovate, with attention to the campus planning process known as The Oregon Experiment. Buildings are seen as solutions in the pattern language of campus planning. The university adheres to the Campus Plan, a document that defines policies and processes within the context of pattern language.

The following table includes most but not all University of Oregon buildings. Bungalow houses in the area of Villard, Moss, and Columbia Streets are not included. Satellite research areas such as Pine Mountain Observatory are not included. Some off-campus buildings in which the university maintains a strategic partnership with other organizations are not included. These structures are listed in the Campus Plan mentioned above. Whenever possible, the origin of proper names is listed in the notes. When the relevant year could not be determined, 0000 is listed.

See also
 List of Marylhurst University buildings
 List of Portland State University buildings
 List of Reed College buildings
 List of University of Portland buildings
 List of Willamette University buildings

Notes

References

External links

The Architecture of the University of Oregon; A History, Bibliography, and Research Guide provides detailed chronologies, documentation, and sources for University of Oregon buildings

Oregon, University of
University of Oregon
University of Oregon buildings
University of Oregon